The Nasserist Unionists Movement – NUM or Nasserite Unification Movement ( | Al-Harakat Al-Tawhidiya Al-Nassiriya) is a minor Lebanese political party headed by Samir Sabbagh. It was founded in 1982 out from a splinter faction of the INM/Al-Mourabitoun, originally under the label Movement of Unionist Nasserites – MUN (Arabic: حركة الوحدويين الناصريين | Harakat al-Wihdawiyin al-Nasiriyin).  The NUM aims to unify all Lebanese Nasserite parties under one leadership and is currently a member of the pro-Syrian March 8 Alliance.

See also
Al-Mourabitoun
Lebanese Civil War
United Nasserite Organization
Popular Nasserist Organization

References
Denise Ammoun, Histoire du Liban contemporain: Tome 2 1943-1990, Fayard, Paris 2005.  (in French) – 
Edgar O'Ballance, Civil War in Lebanon, 1975-92, Palgrave Macmillan, London 1998. 
 Rex Brynen, Sanctuary and Survival: the PLO in Lebanon, Boulder: Westview Press, Oxford 1990.  – 

1982 establishments in Lebanon
Arab nationalism in Lebanon
Arab nationalist militant groups
Factions in the Lebanese Civil War
March 8 Alliance
Nasserist political parties
Nationalist parties in Lebanon
Political parties established in 1982
Socialist parties in Lebanon